Kenya Select are a cricket team which took part in the revamped Logan Cup for 2007. They are the only side to have taken part in the tournament from outside Zimbabwe and it is the first time that a Kenyan cricket team which was not the national side has played first-class cricket.

Captained by Collins Obuya, Kenya Select are for all intents and purposes a 'Kenya A' side and consist mainly of young players. Some of the more established players in the side are Morris Ouma, David Obuya, Tanmay Mishra and Hiren Varaiya.

The team got its first points for the tournament in a draw against Centrals in the 3rd round. Varaiya took a career best 6/68 while Collins Obuya and Alex Obanda scored their maiden first class hundreds.

Kenya Select full squad
Collins Obuya [capt] 
Morris Ouma 
David Obuya 
Tanmay Mishra 
Malhar Patel
Hiren Varaiya 
Alex Obanda
Rakep Patel 
Rajesh Bhudia 
Nehemiah Odhiambo 
Alfred Luseno 
Elijah Otieno 
Prasan Shrinivas 
Sagar Kharia. 
1st Reserve: Mansuk Naran

References

External links
Logan Cup 2007
Article on Kenya Select

Former Zimbabwean first-class cricket teams
Sport in Zimbabwe